The Magic of Boney M. – 20 Golden Hits is a greatest hits album by Euro-Caribbean group Boney M., issued in 1980, which contained all their biggest hits up until that point, including non-album singles "Mary's Boy Child/Oh My Lord" and "Hooray! Hooray! It's a Holi-Holiday", album tracks from Take The Heat Off Me, Love for Sale, Nightflight to Venus and Oceans of Fantasy as well as their most recent double A-side single release "I See a Boat On the River"/ "My Friend Jack".

The Magic of Boney M. – 20 Golden Hits entered the UK charts at number 18 on 12 April 1980, and peaked at number one on 17 May 1980, becoming their third consecutive UK number one album. In Germany, it was released towards the end of April, and entered the German album charts at number three on 5 May 1980, peaking at number two the following week, and staying in the charts for a total of 25 weeks.

Track listing 

Side A:
 "Rivers of Babylon" (Dowe, McNaughton) - 3:59
 Slightly edited 7" mix
 "Daddy Cool" (Farian, Reyam) - 3:25
 Original album/single version
 "Sunny" (Bobby Hebb) - 3:14
 Edited version
 "Belfast" (Billsbury, Deutscher, Menke) - 2:25
 Edited version
 "El Lute" (Farian, Jay, Blum) - 4:24
 Edited version
 "No Woman, No Cry" (Ford, Bob Marley) - 2:58
 Edited version
 "Rasputin" (Farian, Jay, Reyam) - 3:40
 Edited 7" version
 "Painter Man" (Phillips, Pickett) - 3:10
 Original album version
 "Ma Baker" (Farian, Jay, Reyam) - 3:44
 Edited version
 "Gotta Go Home" (Farian, Jay, Huth, Huth) - 3:45
 Oceans of Fantasy album edit

Side B:
 "My Friend Jack" (The Smoke) - 4:31
 Slightly edited 7" mix
 "I See a Boat on the River" (Farian, Jay, Rulofs) - 4:04
 Edited early 7" mix. N.B. 1992 CD edition: edited version - 3:10, taken from Fantastic Boney M.
 "Brown Girl in the Ring" (Farian) - 3:06
 Edited version
 "Mary's Boy Child – Oh My Lord" (Jester Hairston, Farian, Jay, Lorin) - 4:31
 Edited version
 "Bahama Mama" (Farian, Jay) - 3:17
 Oceans of Fantasy 4th pressing edit
 "I'm Born Again" (Jay, Rulofs) - 3:57
 Slightly edited 7" mix
 "Oceans of Fantasy" (Kawohl, Jay, Zill) - 3:19
 Edited version
 "Ribbons of Blue" (Keith Forsey) - 3:04
 Edited 7" mix
 "Still I'm Sad" (McCarthy, Samwell-Smith) - 3:40
 Edited version
 "Hooray! Hooray! It's a Holi-Holiday" (Farian, Jay) - 3:11
 Edited version

Alternate editions 
'Greatest Hits Of Boney M.'
(German Club Edition LP)
Side A:
 "Sunny" (Bobby Hebb) - 3:14
 "Daddy Cool" (Farian, Reyam) - 3:25
 "Belfast" (Billsbury, Deutscher, Menke) - 2:25
 "Ma Baker" (Farian, Jay, Reyam) - 3:44
 "El Lute" (Farian, Jay, Blum) - 4:24
 "Rasputin" (Farian, Jay, Reyam) - 3:40
 "I'm Born Again" (Jay, Rulofs) - 3:57
 "Bahama Mama" (Farian, Jay) - 3:17
Side B:
 "I See a Boat on the River" (Farian, Jay, Rulofs) - 4:04
 "My Friend Jack" (The Smoke) - 4:31
 "Gotta Go Home" (Farian, Jay, Huth, Huth) - 3:45
 "Rivers of Babylon" (Farian, Reyam) - 3:59
 "Mary's Boy Child/Oh My Lord" (Jester Hairston, Farian, Jay, Lorin) - 4:31
 "Brown Girl in the Ring" (Farian) - 3:06
 "Ribbons of Blue" (Keith Forsey) - 3:04
 "Hooray! Hooray! It's a Holi-Holiday" (Farian, Jay) - 3:11

Personnel 
 Liz Mitchell - lead vocals (A1, A3, A5, A6, A8, B2, B3, B4, B6, B8, B9 & B10), backing vocals
 Marcia Barrett - lead vocals (A4), backing vocals
 Frank Farian - lead vocals (A2, A5, A7, A9, A10, B6 & B7), backing vocals
(track denotations refer to original Hansa issue)

Production 
 Frank Farian - producer

Charts

Weekly charts

Year-end charts

Certifications

References

Sources and external links 
 Rate Your Music, detailed discography
 
 [ Allmusic, biography, discography etc.]

Albums produced by Frank Farian
1980 compilation albums
Boney M. compilation albums
Atlantic Records compilation albums
Hansa Records compilation albums